The Garden Bowl is a bowling alley located at 4104–4120 Woodward Avenue in Midtown Detroit, Michigan. It is the oldest continuously operating bowling alley in the country. It was listed on the National Register of Historic Places in 2008.

History
The Garden Bowl was built in 1913, and is Detroit's oldest continuously operating bowling alley. In 1934, the front 35 feet of the building were removed when Woodward Avenue was widened to its present size. The present appearance of the building is due in large part to changes made in 1966.

Current use
The father of the current owner purchased the Garden Bowl in 1946. The Garden Bowl operates as part of the Majestic Theater Center, which includes the nearby Majestic Theatre, the Majestic Cafe, the Magic Stick (located upstairs in the same building as the Garden Bowl), and Sgt. Pepperoni's. It continues to operate as a bowling alley.

References

External links

Garden Bowl

National Register of Historic Places in Detroit
Buildings and structures completed in 1913
Bowling alleys
1913 establishments in Michigan
Woodward Avenue